Metrosideros stipularis is a species of the myrtle family commonly known as tepú, trepú, or tepual. It is an evergreen tree or shrub that can attain a height of about seven metres. The plant is native to southern South America in the southern portions of Chile and Argentina and is a typical resident of very wet areas, especially peat bogs. Tepú has white flowers that emerge during the austral summer from January through March. The tree's wood is used within its range as a firewood due to it high energy content.
This species has often been placed in its own genus Tepualia, but recent works include it in Metrosideros.

References

External links

Description and photos at Enciclopedia de la Flora Chilena 

stipularis
Flora of South America